Indigo Meadow is the fourth studio album by American rock band The Black Angels. It was released on April 2, 2013, by Blue Horizon. "Indigo Meadow" debuted at No. 15 on the Alternative Albums chart.

Track listing

In popular culture
 "War on Holiday" was featured in a montage for Alamo Drafthouse.
 "Evil Things" was featured on From Dusk Till Dawn: The Series, episode 3x08 Rio Sangre
 "Black Isn't Black" was featured in the Syfy''' television show Happy!.

 References 

External links
"Album Review: The Black Angels – Indigo Meadow ". Consequence of Sound.
"Reviews:  The Black Angels Indigo Meadow" Rolling Stone.
"Album review: Indigo Meadow By The Black Angels " Under the Radar''.

2013 albums
Albums produced by John Congleton
The Black Angels (band) albums